Margaret Fay Strelow is an Australian politician who served as the Mayor of the Rockhampton Region from April 2012 to November 2020.

Prior to her election as mayor of the newly amalgamated Rockhampton Region, Strelow served as a councillor for the City of Rockhampton from 1997 to 2000, and Mayor of the City of Rockhampton from 2000 to 2008.

Strelow nominated to become the Australian Labor Party candidate for the Electoral district of Rockhampton at the 2017 Queensland state election, however was not successful. She nominated to run for the seat as an independent candidate, and achieved 23.5% of the vote, finishing second on first preference votes to eventual winner Barry O'Rourke.

On the 22nd of November 2020, following the result of a Councillor Conduct Tribunal, Margaret Strelow resigned from her position as Mayor of the Rockhampton Region.

References

Mayors of places in Queensland
Living people
Year of birth missing (living people)
Women mayors of places in Queensland